Dead arm may refer to:

 Dead arm (grapes), a dieback disease caused by the combination of two fungi, Eutypa armeniacae and Phomopsis viticola
 Dead arm syndrome, a repetitive motion syndrome in people
 Dead Arm, a wine produced by Australian wine estate d'Arenberg